Nathalie Georges Matar (born 20 September 1995) is a Lebanese footballer who plays as a midfielder for French club Grand Calais Pascal and captains the Lebanon national team.

Club career 
On 14 July 2022, Matar moved to Régional 1 Féminine club Grand Calais Pascal.

International career 
Matar was part of the Lebanon national team squad that participated in the 2021 Arab Women's Cup in Egypt. She was called up to represent Lebanon at the 2022 WAFF Women's Championship, helping her side finish runners-up.

Honours
Lebanon
 WAFF Women's Championship runner-up: 2022

See also
 List of Lebanon women's international footballers

References

External links

 
 

1995 births
Living people
People from Baalbek District
Lebanese women's footballers
Lebanese women's futsal players
Women's association football midfielders
Zouk Mosbeh SC footballers
Eleven Football Pro players
Lebanese Women's Football League players
Lebanon women's international footballers
Lebanese expatriate women's footballers
Lebanese expatriate sportspeople in France
Expatriate women's footballers in France